Joseph Mancuso (born May 6, 1941) is an American author, who has written 24 entrepreneurial books for entrepreneurs and CEOs, and an international businessman and keynote speaker. Mancuso is the founder, CEO and current president of CEO Clubs International, a worldwide membership association of mid-market CEOs. He frequently travels the world, opening new chapters, and speaking and doing consulting work with existing international CEO Clubs. He is a well-known business speaker and consultant in Mainland China and Japan.

Education
Mancuso earned a Bachelor's degree in Electrical Engineering from Worcester Polytechnic Institute (WPI) in 1963. He then earned an M.B.A. from Harvard Business School in 1965, and a PhD Doctorate from Boston University in Educational Administration in 1975.

CEO Clubs
Mancuso founded The chief executive officer's Clubs in 1977, and left his professorship at Worcester Polytechnic Institute in Massachusetts to run CEO Clubs full-time in 1978. The CEO Clubs are the world's oldest and largest non-profit business association for CEOs and entrepreneurs. The organization describes its purpose as 'CEOs making money and having fun while learning'. Mancuso also publishes the CEO Clubs chief executive officer newsletter.

Personal life

Mancuso is married, with six children and six grandchildren. He currently resides in New York City.

References

1941 births
American business writers
Worcester Polytechnic Institute alumni
Boston University School of Education alumni
Harvard Business School alumni
Writers from Hartford, Connecticut
Writers from New York City
20th-century American non-fiction writers
American motivational writers
Living people
20th-century American male writers
American male non-fiction writers